The 1975 Maghreb Athletics Championships was the seventh edition of the international athletics competition between the countries of the Maghreb. Algeria, Tunisia and Morocco were the competing nations. Organised by the Union des Fédérations d'Athlétisme du Maghreb Uni (Union of Athletics Federations of the United Maghreb), it took place in Tunis, Tunisia. A total of 37 athletics events were contested, 22 for men and 15 for women.

The tournament was closely contested between the three international teams, as Morocco narrowly won with thirteen gold medals to Algeria and Tunisia's twelve each. It was the second time that the Tunisian capital had hosted the tournament, becoming the first city to hold the event on multiple occasions. Track events were only officially timed to the tenth of a second. It was the final time that the women's pentathlon was held at the competition. A women's 3000 metres featured on the programme, which was the first time a long-distance event had been held for female athletes at the championships. The 1975 edition marked the last in the first regular series of Maghreb Championships, as the competition did not return until six years later and never again had a regular schedule.

Medal summary

Men

Women

References

Champions
Les championnats maghrebins d athletisme. Union Sportive Oudja. Retrieved on 2015-02-20.

Maghreb Athletics Championships
Sport in Tunis
Maghreb Athletics Championships
Maghreb Athletics Championships
20th century in Tunis
International athletics competitions hosted by Tunisia